West Coast Fever  is an Australian netball team based in  Perth, Western Australia. Since 2017 they have played in Suncorp Super Netball. Between 2008 and 2016, they competed in the ANZ Championship. Between 1997 and 2007, as Perth Orioles, they competed in the Commonwealth Bank Trophy league. During the ANZ Championship era, Fever were the only Australian team not to win a title, play in a grand final or feature in a finals series. However, during the Suncorp Super Netball era they emerged as challengers. They were grand finalists in both 2018 and 2020, and eventually claimed their first premiership in 2022.

History

Perth Orioles

Between 1997 and 2007, Perth Orioles represented Netball Western Australia in the Commonwealth Bank Trophy. In 2008, when the Commonwealth Bank Trophy was replaced by the ANZ Championship, Perth Orioles were rebranded as West Coast Fever.

ANZ Championship 
Between 2008 and 2016, West Coast Fever played in the ANZ Championship. Fever's best performance in the ANZ Championship came in 2015 when they won nine games and finished third in the Australian Conference.

Statistics

Suncorp Super Netball 
Challengers
Since 2017, West Coast Fever have played in   Suncorp Super Netball. In 2018, Fever reached their first ever grand final. The team was coached by Stacey Marinkovich and captained by Courtney Bruce. During the regular season they finished second. Jhaniele Fowler finished the season as both Player of the Year and Leading Goalscorer while Jessica Anstiss was named young player of the year. In the grand final Fever lost 62–59 to Sunshine Coast Lightning. Fever were again grand finalists and runners–up in the 2020, losing to Melbourne Vixens by two goals.

Salary cap breach
In December 2020 Fever were fined $300,000, of which $150,000 was suspended, and stripped 12 premiership points for the 2021 season, after they were found to have breached the salary cap in the 2018 and 2019 seasons. The penalties amounted to the biggest in Australian netball history, with a Netball Australia investigation determining the Fever made payments of more than $127,000 above the salary cap in 2018, and more than $168,000 above the cap in 2019.

First premiership
In 2022, head coach Dan Ryan and captain Courtney Bruce led West Coast Fever to their first premiership. In the grand final they defeated Melbourne Vixens 70-59.

Statistics

Grand Finals

Home venues
West Coast Fever play the majority of their home games at Perth Arena. Fever hosted the 2018 Suncorp Super Netball grand final at Perth Arena. They have also played home games at HBF Stadium.

Notable players

2023 squad

Internationals

 Ama Agbeze
 Karen Atkinson
 Stacey Francis-Bayman
 Chelsea Pitman
 Eboni Usoro-Brown

 Jhaniele Fowler

 Larrissa Willcox
 Erena Mikaere

Captains

SSN Award winners
Player of the Year

Leading Goalscorer Award

Young Star Award

Head coaches

Western Sting

Western Sting are the reserve team of West Coast Fever. They play in the Australian Netball League. They were ANL champions in 2017.

Premierships

Suncorp Super Netball
Winners: 2022
Runners Up: 2018, 2020

External links
  West Coast Fever on Facebook
  West Coast Fever on Twitter

References

 
ANZ Championship teams
Netball teams in Australia
Netball teams in Western Australia
Representative sports teams of Western Australia
Sporting clubs in Perth, Western Australia
Suncorp Super Netball teams